Jules Noël (27 January 1903 – 19 May 1940) was a French athlete who competed in discus and shot put at two European Athletics Championships and three Olympic Games.

Biography
Jules Noël was born on 27 January 1903 in Norrent-Fontes, Pas-de-Calais, France.  He joined the French Army and rose to the rank of Sergeant.

Career
After an impressive silver medal at the Championnats de France d'athlétisme, a competition in which he would achieve 19 medals including 13 golds over the next 12 years, Noël was selected for the French Olympic discus team for the 1928 Games in Amsterdam.  Though he finished some way off the medal positions he went on to break the French discus record in the trials for the 1932 Summer Olympics, throwing 49.44 m.  He travelled to the Games in Los Angeles, California and led out the team in the opening ceremony as the French flag bearer.  The French team convinced the U.S. officials that wine was an essential part of their competitors' diets, receiving special permission to circumvent the prohibition in force across the country.  Noël took full advantage of this and is reported as "swigging champagne with his compatriots" in the locker room between rounds at the discus event.  There was then further controversy when Noël finished in fourth place: the officials in charge of the event disallowed a throw that is believed to have been farther than gold medal winner John Anderson's 49.39 m attempt.  The throw was not accepted because the officials did not see where it landed, their attention being drawn to the pole vaulting competition instead.  Noël was allowed an additional attempt but could not match his earlier performance, reaching 47.74 m and finishing fourth.  Anderson went on to improve his distance to 49.49 m, an Olympic record.

Noël went on to compete at the inaugural European Athletics Championships in 1934 in Turin, Italy, finishing seventh in the discus and tenth in the shot put.  The 1936 Olympic Games were held in Berlin and Noël was again selected as the flag bearer for his country.  Noël returned to European competition at the 1938 Championships in Paris, again finishing seventh in the discus and improving to ninth in the shot put.

Death
Noël died during World War II from a wound sustained during a battle outside Escaudœuvres near Cambrai.

References

1903 births
1940 deaths
Sportspeople from Pas-de-Calais
French male discus throwers
French male shot putters
Olympic athletes of France
Athletes (track and field) at the 1928 Summer Olympics
Athletes (track and field) at the 1932 Summer Olympics
Athletes (track and field) at the 1936 Summer Olympics
French military personnel killed in World War II
French Army soldiers